Tariq Al-Ali (born January 18, 1966) is a Kuwaiti comedian and actor.

Biography
Al-Ali lost his father before his birth. He started acting in 1983 and has participated in many theatrical plays, films and TV series.  

He is married, and has four children.

References 

1966 births
Male comedians
Kuwaiti male actors
Living people